Darren Mark Cousins (born 24 September 1971) is a former professional English cricketer. He was a right-handed batsman and a right-arm medium-fast bowler who used to play for Essex, Northamptonshire, Surrey and Cambridgeshire. His contract was terminated in 2003 after fracturing his navicular whilst playing for Northamptonshire.

His father Dennis Cousins played List A cricket for Cambridgeshire in one match in 1972.

External links
 

1971 births
Living people
Cricketers from Cambridgeshire
English cricketers
Essex cricketers
Surrey cricketers
Northamptonshire cricketers
Sportspeople from Cambridge
Cambridgeshire cricketers